The Scotland women's national field hockey team represents Scotland in international women's field hockey competitions, with the exception of the Olympic Games when Scottish players are eligible to play for the Great Britain women's national field hockey team as selected. Scotland recently participated in the inaugural season of the FIH Hockey World League, but were knocked out in round 2, failing to qualify for the 2014 Hockey World Cup in The Hague, Netherlands.  they are seventeenth in the FIH outdoor world rankings.

Competing as Great Britain
Scotland do not compete at the Olympic Games, but Scottish players are eligible to play for Great Britain as selected. Great Britain instead of the four individual home nations (including Scotland) also compete at certain editions of both the FIH Hockey World League, usually when the tournament serves as an Olympic Games qualifier (most recently in 2014–15), and the FIH Hockey Champions Trophy, when held during Olympic years (most recently in 2016).

At the 1992 Olympic Games, Scottish field hockey players, Susan Fraser, Wendy Fraser and Alison Ramsay won bronze medals, as part of the Great Britain team in the women's tournament. Scottish players Laura Bartlett and Emily Maguire repeated the feat at the 2012 Olympic Games. Also with the Great Britain team, Maguire won silver at the 2012 FIH Hockey Champions Trophy (as did Bartlett), and a gold medal for winning the 2014–15 FIH Hockey World League Semi-finals.

Tournament history
 Champions   Runners-up   Third place   Fourth place'An asterisk denotes draws include knockout matches decided on penalty shootouts.A red box around the year indicates tournaments played within Scotland.''

World Cup

World League

Commonwealth Games

EuroHockey Nations Championship

Champions Challenge I

Hockey World Cup Qualifier

EuroHockey Nations Indoor Championship
1998 – 4th place
2000 – 4th place
2002 – 8th place
2006 – 4th place
2008 – 4th place
2010 – 7th place
2012 Challenge II – 5th place
2014 Challenge II – 3rd place

Players

Current squad
The following 18 players were named in the Scotland team for the 2021 Women's EuroHockey Nations Championship.

Head coach:  Jennifer Wilson

Notable former players
 Laura Bartlett
 Susan Fraser
 Wendy Fraser
 Alison Ramsay
 Pauline Robertson
 Rhona Simpson

See also
Scotland men's national field hockey team

References

External links

FIH profile

national team
European women's national field hockey teams
Field hockey